The Gros Morne is a volcanic peak on the island of Réunion, located to the north of the town of Cilaos. Lying just to the west of its slightly taller neighbour, the Piton des Neiges, the Gros Morne rises to a height of 3019 metres. The Rivière des Galets rises on the peak's western slopes.

See also
 Piton des Neiges – Gros Morne Important Bird Area

References

Mountains of Réunion